Charles Romilly (1808 – 26 August 1887) was an English cricketer with amateur status. He was associated with Marylebone Cricket Club (MCC) and made his first-class debut in 1828.

References

1808 births
1887 deaths
English cricketers
English cricketers of 1826 to 1863
Gentlemen cricketers
Marylebone Cricket Club cricketers
Non-international England cricketers
Gentlemen of England cricketers
A to K v L to Z cricketers
Married v Single cricketers